Valentin Ivaylov Antov (born 9 November 2000) is a Bulgarian professional footballer who plays as a centre-back or defensive midfielder for  club Monza.

A youth product of CSKA Sofia, Antov became the youngest player ever to represent the club when he made his debut in 2015 at the age of 14 years, 9 months and 10 days. He moved on loan to Serie A side Bologna in the second half of the 2020–21 season, and to Serie B side Monza in the summer of 2021.

Antov has represented Bulgaria internationally at every level, making his debut for the senior team in March 2019 at the age of 18.

Club career

CSKA Sofia

Antov came up through CSKA's youth academy and impressed from an early age. He made his first-team debut on 19 August 2015, in a Bulgarian Cup match against Sofia 2010, becoming CSKA's youngest ever debutant at the age of 14 years, 9 months and 10 days, while also becoming the youngest ever captain for the club after taking the captain's armband for the last 25 minutes of the match.

Antov made his First League debut on 14 April 2018, in a league match against Vereya. Antov began to establish himself in the CSKA first team during the 2018–19 season, playing 26 matches in all competitions. On 12 July 2018, he made his debut in the Europa League playing 90 minutes in the first match of the first qualifying round against Latvian club Riga. He scored his first competitive goal for the club, netting CSKA's second in a 5–0 league victory against Beroe Stara Zagora on 12 July 2020.

In August 2020, he was named as the new club captain.

Loan to Bologna
On 1 February 2021, Antov was loaned to Serie A club Bologna until the end of the season with an option for a permanent transfer.

Monza
On 27 August 2021, Antov was sent on a one-year loan to Serie B side Monza, with a conditional obligation for purchase. He made his debut on 21 September, as a starter in a 2–1 defeat to Pisa in the league. Following Monza's Serie A promotion on 29 May 2022, Antov's obligation for purchase clause was triggered.

International career
Antov made his debut for Bulgaria national team on 25 March 2019, as an 80th-minute substitute for Georgi Kostadinov in a Euro 2020 qualifier against Kosovo. He scored his first international goal on 23 September 2022, in a 5–1 win against Gibraltar in the 2022–23 UEFA Nations League.

Personal life
Antov is a nephew of former footballer Anatoli Nankov.

Career statistics

Club

International

Scores and results list Bulgaria's goal tally first, score column indicates score after each Antov goal.

Honours
CSKA Sofia
 Bulgarian Cup: 2015–16, 2020–21
 V Group: 2015–16

Individual
 Bulgarian Youth Footballer of the Year: 2018
 Bulgarian First League Best Defender of the Year: 2020

References

External links

 
 

2000 births
Living people
Footballers from Sofia
Bulgarian footballers
Association football midfielders
Association football defenders
PFC CSKA Sofia players
Bologna F.C. 1909 players
A.C. Monza players
First Professional Football League (Bulgaria) players
Serie A players
Serie B players
Bulgaria youth international footballers
Bulgaria international footballers
Bulgarian expatriate footballers
Bulgarian expatriate sportspeople in Italy
Expatriate footballers in Italy